Lukáš Ďuriška (born 16 August 1992) is a Slovak professional footballer who plays as a defensive midfielder for AS Trenčín.

Club career
In the summer of 2013, he played in Malta for Mosta.

On 31 July 2020, he signed a two-year deal with Zagłębie Sosnowiec. On 23 May 2022, it was announced he would leave the team at the end of his contract.
By June 2022, Ďuriška returned to play for AS Trenčín as a free agent.

Career statistics

External links
AS Trenčín profile

References

1992 births
Living people
Slovak footballers
Slovak expatriate footballers
Association football midfielders
AS Trenčín players
Slovak Super Liga players
Eerste Divisie players
I liga players
II liga players
AGOVV Apeldoorn players
Mosta F.C. players
FK Frýdek-Místek players
Raków Częstochowa players
Ruch Chorzów players
Olimpia Grudziądz players
Zagłębie Sosnowiec players
Slovak expatriate sportspeople in the Netherlands
Slovak expatriate sportspeople in Malta
Slovak expatriate sportspeople in Poland
Expatriate footballers in the Netherlands
Expatriate footballers in Malta
Expatriate footballers in Poland
Sportspeople from Trenčín